Tofaş Spor Kulübü (English: Tofaş Sports Club) (more commonly known as Tofaş) is a professional basketball team that is based in Bursa, Turkey. Their home arena is the Tofaş Nilüfer Spor Salonu, with a capacity of 7,500 seats. The team is sponsored by Turkish car manufacturer Tofaş.

The team competes in the Turkish Basketball Super League (BSL).

History

Tofaş was founded in 1974. The team won the BSL in two consecutive seasons, in the 1998–99 and 1999–2000 seasons. The following year, however, the team withdrew from the league, for financial reasons. They returned to competition in the BSL in the 2003–04 season, but they were relegated down a league level the following year. 

Tofaş next played in the BSL, from the 2009–10 season, to the 2014–15 season. In addition to the club's two Turkish Super League titles (1999, 2000), the team has also won three Turkish Cups (1993, 1999, 2000), and a Turkish President's Cup (1999). In the club's heyday, the team also achieved significant success at the European-wide continental level. Such as being the runner-up in the European-wide third-tier level FIBA Korać Cup's 1996–97 season Final against the Greek club Aris Thessaloniki. 

Tofaş also competed in the European-wide top-tier level EuroLeague, in the 1999–2000 season.

In 2015, Tofaş relegated from the BSL to the First League. The club immediately promoted back as it was the 2016 TBL champion. The club played in the European-wide second-tier level EuroCup, in the 2017–18 season. The same season, Tofaş reached the 2018 finals of the BSL. Despite winning game 3 at home, the team fell to Fenerbahçe and lost the series 4–1.

Arenas
Tofaş S.K. used the 3,500-seat capacity Bursa Atatürk Sport Hall, as its home arena for many years. The club then moved into the 7,500-seat capacity Tofaş Nilüfer Spor Salonu.

Current roster

Depth chart

Notable players

  Alper Yılmaz
 - Asım Pars
  Can Altıntığ
  Cüneyt Erden
  Efe Aydan
  Kenan Sipahi
  Levent Topsakal
  Mehmet Okur
  Mehmet Yağmur
  Hakan Köseoğlu
  İlkan Karaman
  İnanç Koç
  Serkan Erdoğan
  Şemsettin Baş
  Vasilije Micić
  Jurica Žuža
  Slaven Rimac
  Vladan Alanović
  Mindaugas Lukauskis
  Sergei Bazarevich
  Jure Zdovc
  Bradley Buckman
  Brandon Bowman
  Diante Garrett
  Buck Johnson
  Chris Booker
  David Rivers
  Josh Heytvelt
  Marc Jackson
  Rashard Griffith
  Ronald Steele
  Steve Burtt, Jr.
  Steven Rogers

Honours
 Basketball Super League
 Winners (2): 1998-99, 1999-00
 Turkish Basketball Cup
 Winners (3): 1993, 1998-99, 1999-00
 Turkish Basketball Presidential Cup
 Winners (1): 1999

Season by season

 Cancelled due to the COVID-19 pandemic in Europe.

References

External links 
 Official Website 
 Eurobasket.com Page
 TBLStat.net Team Profile

Basketball teams in Turkey
Turkish Basketball Super League teams
Sport in Bursa